Charles Page (1860–1926) was an American philanthropist, creator of Sand Springs Home for orphans and widows .

Charles Page may also refer to:
Charlie Page (1917–2010), Australian footballer
Charles B. Page (1851–1912), American lawyer and politician
Charles Edward Page (1840-1925), American physician and hydrotherapist
Charles Grafton Page (1812–1868), American inventor
Charles H. Page (1843–1912), U.S. Representative from Rhode Island
Charles Henry Page (1876–1957), Texas architect
Charles Page (photographer) (born 1946), Australian photographer
Charles Page (cricketer) (1884–1921), English cricketer